Ebenezer Thayer, Jr. (August 21, 1746 – May 30, 1809) was a Massachusetts farmer, military officer, town official, and politician who served in both branches of the Massachusetts legislature, as a member of the Massachusetts Governor's Council; and, from 1793 to 1794, as the first sheriff of Norfolk County, Massachusetts.

The Braintree Instructions, drafted by John Adams, were addressed to Thayer's father, Ebenezer Thayer, Esq., from his constituents in Braintree.

Military service
During the American Revolutionary War Thayer was active in recruiting men in his home town and in leading them in the war.

Family
His half-brother was Atherton Thayer.

Over a number of generations the Thayer family became known as a Boston Brahmin family and descended from early settlers and brothers Thomas Thayer (1596–1665) and Richard Thayer (1601–1664).

References

Members of the Massachusetts Governor's Council
1746 births
1809 deaths
Politicians from Braintree, Massachusetts
Massachusetts militiamen in the American Revolution
Members of the Massachusetts House of Representatives
Massachusetts state senators
High Sheriffs of Norfolk County